Sir Martyn Arbib (born 27 June 1939) is a British businessman who founded and led the Perpetual fund management company during the late 20th century.

Early life
Arbib was born in Hendon on 29 June 1939, and attended Felsted School, Essex. His family is Jewish.

Career
Arbib founded Perpetual Limited in 1973 in a small office at Hart Street, Henley-on-Thames, Oxfordshire. The company remained in the town as it expanded into newly built headquarters in 1994.

He sold Perpetual to the fund manager AMVESCAP in 2001 for more than £1 billion, receiving £113m together with AMVESCAP shares worth £300m, and the company became known as Invesco Perpetual.  He is a director of the Perpetual Japanese Investment Trust plc. He stepped down from Perpetual's board in 2015.

In January 2008, Swindon Town Holdings Limited, where Arbib is an investor but not a director, took control of Swindon Town FC.

The Arbib Foundation, established in 1987, sponsors schools in Slough, Berkshire which include the Langley Academy. Arbib was a major benefactor in the establishment of the River and Rowing Museum at Henley, which opened in 1998. He was knighted in 2003 for services to charities, especially in education.

Political activity
Arbib is a Conservative Party donor. During the 2019 United Kingdom general election, he donated £10,000 to the central party and £5,000 each to Conservative candidates Danny Kruger and Dominic Raab.

Personal life
In his spare time, Arbib is interested in horse racing. His horse Snurge won the St. Leger Stakes in 1990. As well as Henley, he also has a home in Barbados.

His daughter Annabel is married to businessman Paddy Nicoll. Her father bought Culham Court for her in 1997 for £12 million, and in 2006, the Swiss-born British financier Urs Schwarzenbach bought it for £35 million, £10 million above the asking price.

References

External links 
 Rich list entry in the Sunday Times, 2005
 Rich list entry in the Sunday Times, 2004

1939 births
Living people
People educated at Felsted School
People from Henley-on-Thames
British racehorse owners and breeders
Businesspeople awarded knighthoods
Knights Bachelor
Conservative Party (UK) donors
People from Hendon
Businesspeople from London